The Norwegian battle axe, also called Norwegian peasant militia axe, Norwegian peasant axe or peasant battle axe (Norwegian: bondeøks or bondestridsøks), is a tool and weapon from Norway, which was an important part of the Norwegian national defense in the 1600s.

Description 
The axe has great symbolic worth in Scandinavia, and appears in the coat of arms of Norway and as a symbol of Saint Olav, the patron saint of Norway. The peasant axe has a mostly straight shaft with a distinct curve towards the blade. The blade is crescent-shaped blade and single-edged. It is assumed that the axe is a further development of the Viking axe, also known as the Danish axe. The shape of the shaft favors a cutting effect from the blade. Peasant axes were often highly decorated and had a high status in the Norwegian culture as a symbol of the free farmer.

Gallery

See also
 Dane axe
 Shepherd's axe
 Bearded axe
 Pike pole

References

Further reading 
 George Cameron Stein, Donald J. LaRocca: En Ordliste med Bygging, Innredning og Bruk av Våpen og Rustninger: i Alle Land og til Alle Tider.  Verlag Courier Dover Publications, 1999,  (Opptrykk), side 80.
Norheim, Per Terje, Fuglseth, Erik: Våpen i Norge, Damm forlag (2000)  (Norwegian)
Mathisen, Trygve: Fra bondeoppbud til legdshær, Gyldendal (1952) (Norwegian)
Kong Christian den Fjerdes norske Lovbog af 1604 (Norwegian)

External links 
 Norwegian military small-arms & blades » The Norwegian Battle axe
 Økser som våpen hos Maihaugen  (Norwegian)
 Picture Gallery at DigitaltMuseum

Weapons of Norway
Axes